Aubiege Njampou Nono (born 8 May 1982) is a Cameroonian handball player for FAP Yaoundé and the Cameroonian national team.

She participated at the 2017 World Women's Handball Championship.

References

1982 births
Living people
Cameroonian female handball players
20th-century Cameroonian women
21st-century Cameroonian women